Garfield Park is a neighborhood park in Washington D.C. Named after President Garfield, it is located at the intersection of 2nd Street and G Street in the Capitol Hill neighborhood of Southeast, Washington, D.C. It is bounded by 3rd street on the east and New Jersey Avenue on the west. South Carolina Avenue and F Street bound it on the north, and its southern border is Interstate 695.

A large playground is located near its center, and the park also hosts a number of sport amenities such as tennis courts, a volley ball court, bocce courts, and a baseball backstop along with picnic tables and benches.
The park is maintained by the DC Department of Parks and Recreation. It is categorized as a neighborhood park, which means that it provides an informal park settings for recreational purposes for the immediate neighborhood.

History

This open space was originally included in the 1791 urban plan for Washington, L'Enfant Plan. 
The land was purchased by the U.S. government from Daniel Carroll of Duddington and designated as Reservation No. 17.
The site may have been selected by L'Enfant because it contained several natural springs, and he indicated that it should be the site for a grand cascade.
Over the years, the lot was significantly reduced in size by railroads, freeways, and the Capitol Power Plant.

One of the city's original landowners, Daniel Carroll of Duddington, built Duddington Manor, a grand mansion which faced the park from the north until it was razed in 1886 to be replaced by row houses. Indian remains were found during grading excavations, directly south of the estate, which suggests that the location may have been the site of a Nacotchtank settlement.

Part of the park was transferred to the District of Columbia for the construction of Interstate 695 in 1969. A basketball court, still accessible from the park, was built underneath the highway to mitigate the loss of park space.

Basketball great, Elgin Baylor, who lived a block away on Duddington Place, shot hoops in the park growing up.  At one point, the Park had a wading pool, which consistent with the times was segregated.

In 1948, the park was part of a summer-long experiment on the racial integration of playgrounds in the District. Integration at Garfield Park was noted as being more difficult. At the time the neighborhood was approximately 25% white. The integration of the wading pool and baseball field was deemed unsuccessful due to strong opposition by white neighbors and was discontinued.
The Supreme Court's decision, Bolling v. Sharpe, 347 U.S. 497 (1952), the landmark Supreme Court that desegregated public schools in the District of Columbia, ended all segregation within the city.

Ownership of the remaining 7.1-acre park was transferred to the District of Columbia in 1972.

References

Capitol Hill
Parks in Washington, D.C.
Urban public parks